Heinz Leibinger (born 9 January 1941) is a German former sports shooter. He competed in the trap event at the 1972 Summer Olympics for West Germany.

References

External links
 

1941 births
Living people
German male sport shooters
Olympic shooters of West Germany
Shooters at the 1972 Summer Olympics
People from Reutlingen
Sportspeople from Tübingen (region)
20th-century German people